Jean-Frédéric Phélypeaux, Count of Maurepas (9 July 1701 – 21 November 1781) was a French statesman and Count of Maurepas.

Biography

Early years

He was born at Versailles, of a family of administrative nobility, the son of Jérôme Phélypeaux, secretary of state for the marine and the royal household. Under the guidance of his father, his grandfather and his cousin Louis Phélypeaux, marquis de La Vrillière, Jean-Frederic was trained from childhood to be secretary of state to the king of France. Jean-Frederic had right en survivance to the position of secretary of state, under Philippe II, as his father Jerome had purchased the office with the right of inheritance.

In 1718 at the age of 17, Jean became the minister of the royal household and Comte de Maurepas under the guardianship of his cousin La Vrillière. Shortly after he married the daughter of his cousin, Marie-Jeanne. Five years later on 16 August he began his duties as ministre de la marine to Louis XV administering the navy, colonies and seaborne trade. In 1738 he was promoted to the council of state, and in time aided the king, alongside several other ministers in making significant political decisions. Jean continued his administrative career after the death of his guardian, and was ministre de la marine until 23 April 1749, when he was removed in a coup.

Political rising

Skilled in military and naval strategy, Maurepas enabled the French navy to regain previously lost prestige and France was once again recognized as a maritime power. One way that he improved the French reputation was by focusing on the defense of France's sprawling empire in the New World, especially in the 1730s and 1740s. His defense plans were aided by information on British naval manoeuvres, lists of what ships were coming to North America and detailed memoirs of ship construction. Jean-Frederic obtained this information through maintaining an intelligence service that was considered one of the most efficient in Europe.  This was only made possible due to the drastic funding increases he managed to obtain for the Troupes de la Marine. The typical budget appropriated to the marine from the mid-1720s to mid-1730s was 9 million livres; in 1739, however, Jean-Frederic managed to obtain a budget of 19.2 million livres. In the following years he acquired budgets of 20 million livres in 1740, 26 million in 1741 and 27 million in 1742. Over his career as administrator he held the positions of chamberlain of the royal household, minister of the marine, and director of the secret service, fulfilling his duties with efficiency and precision.

Political decline
In 1749, Maurepas was removed by a coup led by Duke of Richelieu, putting an end to his period of immense success. He was exiled from Paris for an epigram against Madame de Pompadour, and went to Bourges and then onto Pontchartrain. In 1774, he was appointed to minister of state to Louis XVI, as well as chief adviser, holding both positions until 1781. He gave Turgot the direction of finance, placed Lamoignon-Malesherbes over the royal household and made Vergennes minister for foreign affairs. At the outset of his new career he showed his weakness by recalling to their functions, in deference to popular clamour, the members of the old Parlement ousted by Maupeou, thus reconstituting the most dangerous enemy of the royal power. This step, and his intervention on behalf of the American states, helped to pave the way for the French Revolution.

Jealous of his personal ascendancy over Louis XVI, he intrigued against Turgot, whose disgrace in 1776 was followed after six months of disorder by the appointment of Jacques Necker. In 1781 Maurepas deserted Necker as he had done Turgot, and he died at Versailles on 21 November 1781.

Legacy
Maurepas is credited with contributions to the collection of facetiae known as the Etrennes de la Saint Jean (2nd ed., 1742). Four volumes of Memoires de Maurepas, purporting to be collected by his secretary and edited by J.L.G. Soulavie in 1792, included information on the North American colonies, the fall of Louisbourg, trade in the Caribbean, the censorship of books and administration. He also recorded extensive information on all naval matters including naval construction, navigation sailing instructions and fighting at sea. The collection of memoirs is now in the possession of Cornell University.

Lake Maurepas, Louisiana, USA was named for him, showing his surviving influence on the New World.

References

See also
 Comte de Maurepas (ship)
 Maurepas, France
 

1701 births
1781 deaths
People from Versailles
Counts of Maurepas
Members of the French Academy of Sciences
Secretaries of State of the Navy (France)